Jerome Odell Gunderson, Sr. (January 7, 1923 – December 19, 2016) was an American businessman, farmer, and politician who served as a member of the Minnesota Senate from 1977 to 1980.

Early life 
Gunderson was born in Spring Grove, Minnesota and graduated from Spring Grove High School.

Career 
He lived in Mabel, Minnesota and was a farmer. Gunderson was also involved with the insurance business. Gunderson served on the Mabel-Canton School Board and in the Minnesota Senate from 1977 to 1980 as a member of the Minnesota Democratic–Farmer–Labor Party.

Death 
He died at Gundersen-Tweeten Health Care in Spring Grove, Minnesota.

Notes

External links

1923 births
2016 deaths
People from Spring Grove, Minnesota
People from Mabel, Minnesota
Businesspeople from Minnesota
Farmers from Minnesota
School board members in Minnesota
Democratic Party Minnesota state senators
20th-century American businesspeople